Fletcher Challenge was a multinational corporation from New Zealand. It was formed in 1981 by the merger of Fletcher Holdings, Challenge Corporation and Tasman Pulp and Paper. It had holdings in construction, forestry, building, and energy, initially just within New Zealand and then internationally as well, and at one time was the largest company in New Zealand. In 2001 it was split into three companies, Fletcher Challenge Forests, Fletcher Building (incorporating Fletcher Construction), and Rubicon.

History
The corporation was formed in January 1981 with the mutual merger of Challenge Corporation, Fletcher Holdings and Tasman Pulp and Paper. It was initially based in Wellington's Challenge House, but later moved in 1987 to a new head office in Penrose, Auckland.

In 1987 the corporation acquired the state-owned enterprise Petrocorp, and created the Fletcher Energy division. Fletcher Energy's assets were subsequently sold to Shell New Zealand.

In November 1993 Fletcher Challenge's share market listing was split into two shares, the Ordinary Division and Forests Division. The Forests Division consisted of the corporation's wood plantation assets and forestry activities. The Ordinary Division consisted of the corporation's pulp and paper, energy and building assets.

In March 1996 the Ordinary Division was split further by creating three new shares - Fletcher Challenge Paper, Fletcher Challenge Building and Fletcher Challenge Energy. This structure lasted three years, until December 1999 when the Board of Directors of the company resolved to dismantle the Fletcher Challenge and establish separate companies.

In 2000 the Canadian pulp and paper assets were sold to Norske Skog to form NorskeCanada.  In 2001 Fletcher Challenge was split into three companies, Fletcher Challenge Forests (later renamed Tenon), Fletcher Building (incorporating Fletcher Construction), and Rubicon.

A September 1996 investment in Central North Island Forest Partnership ended in receivership and is said to have contributed to the break up of Fletcher Challenge.

Battle of the Titans
The rise and fall of Fletcher Challenge and some of the principal personalities involved, including Hugh Fletcher and Sir Ronald Trotter is described in the book Battle of the Titans by Bruce Wallace.

Subsidiary companies 
Subsidiaries were:

 Australian Newsprint Mills
 Blandin Paper Co
 Cape Horn Methanol Ltd - bought 1991
 Cemac (Hong Kong) Ltd - founded 1971 now in Fletcher Building
Challenge Deer Ltd
 Challenge Livestock Ltd
 Challenge Properties Ltd - joint venture
 Challenge Realty Ltd - formed 1994 as franchise name
 Challenge Seeds Ltd 1987-1994
 Challenge Wool Ltd
 Crown Paper Co Ltd
 Dinwiddie Construction Co
 Firth Industries Ltd
 Fletcher Challenge Canada Ltd
 Fletcher Challenge Methanol Ltd
 Fletcher Challenge Petroleum Ltd
 Fletcher Construction Australia Ltd
 Fletcher Construction Co Ltd
 Fletcher Construction Group Ltd
 Fletcher Development & Construction Co Ltd
 Fletcher Homes Ltd
 Fletcher Merchants Ltd
 Fletcher Pacific Construction Co Ltd
 Fletcher Panel Industries Ltd
 Fletcher Steel Sector
 Golden Bay Cement Co Ltd
 Jennings Group Ltd
 Pacific Coilcoaters Ltd
 Pacific Steel Ltd
 Petralgas Chemicals NZ Ltd 1980-2005
 Petroleum Corporation of New Zealand Ltd
 Pisa-Papel de Imprensa SA
 Placemakers Ltd
 Rural Bank
 Tasman Asia Shipping Co Ltd
 Tasman Chile SA
 Tasman Forestry Ltd
 Tasman Lumber Co Ltd
 Tasman Pulp & Paper
 The Rural Bank Ltd
 UK Paper plc
 William Guppy & Son Ltd
 Winstone Aggregates Ltd
 Winstone Industries Ltd
 Wiremakers Ltd
 Wright Schuchart Inc
 Wrightson
 Wrightson Bloodstock Ltd
 Wrightson NMA Ltd

References

External links
 Fletcher Challenge Archives
 Fletcher Construction
 Tenon
 Rubicon

 
Defunct companies of New Zealand